The Rainbow Stories is a collection of short stories about American culture written by William T. Vollmann and published in 1989. Written in the style of narrative journalism, it was his second published fictional work, preceded by You Bright and Risen Angels.  The book consists of thirteen interlocking stories (based on the colours of the rainbow) that range in scope from ancient Babylon to modern San Francisco. Steven Moore wrote of the book that "Vollmann's verbal prowess, empathy, and astonishing range put him in a class apart from his contemporaries." Robert Rebein described the book as a "real breakthrough" for Vollman, stating: "[Rainbow Stories is] a book that mixed reportorial and fictional techniques to powerfully evoke the lives of prostitutes and skinheads on the streets of San Francisco's Tenderloin district."

References 

1989 short story collections
Works by William T. Vollmann
Atheneum Books books